The Moment of the Magician (1984) is a fantasy novel by American writer Alan Dean Foster. The book follows the continuing adventures of Jonathan Thomas Meriweather who is transported from our world into a land of talking animals and magic. It is the fourth book in the Spellsinger series.

Plot introduction
The wizard Clothahump described the swamps of the south as "tropical, friendly, and largely uninhabited" when he sent Jon-Tom the Spellsinger and Mudge the Otter to investigate the rising power of a new magician, Marcus the Ineluctable. Along the way they encounter warring colonies of tough-talking prairie dogs, magical mime-vines, a mammoth mountain of living muck and a hidden colony of dreaded Plated Folk.

External links

Alan Dean Foster homepage

1984 American novels
American fantasy novels
Novels by Alan Dean Foster
Spellsinger series